Agh Bolagh-e Olya (also Romanized as Āgh Bolāgh-e ‘Olyā; also known as Āgh Bolāgh-e Bālā and Āq Bolāgh-e Bālā) is a village in Arshaq-e Markazi Rural District, Arshaq District, Meshgin Shahr County, Ardabil Province, Iran. At the 2006 census, its population was 24, in 6 families.

References 

Towns and villages in Meshgin Shahr County